Micha Ullman (born 11 October 1939) is an Israeli sculptor and professor of art.

Biography
Ullman was born in Tel Aviv to German Jews who immigrated to Mandate Palestine in 1933. As a teenager, he attended the Kfar HaYarok agricultural school. 
In 1960-1964, he studied at Bezalel Academy of Art and Design in Jerusalem. In 1965, he attended the Central School of Arts and Crafts in London, where he learned etching.

Ullman is married to Mira, and lives in Ramat Hasharon, Israel.

Academic career
He taught at Bezalel Academy in 1970 - 1978. He became a visiting professor at Academy of Arts Düsseldorf in 1976. He taught at the University of Haifa from 1979 - 1989. He was appointed Professor of Sculpture at the State Academy of Fine Arts Stuttgart from 1991 to 2005.

Artistic career

Ullman created the underground “Empty Library” memorial on Bebelplatz square in Berlin, where the Nazi book burnings began in 1933. The memorial consists of a window on the surface of the plaza, under which vacant bookshelves are lit and visible. A bronze plaque bears a quote by Heinrich Heine: “Where books are burned in the end people will burn.” This memorial was inaugurated in May 1995. (see book burning). Ullman explains: "It begins with the void that exists in every pit and will not disappear. You could say that emptiness is a state, a situation formed by the sides of the pit: The deeper it is, the more sky there will be and the greater the void. In the library containing the missing books, that void is more palpable. We expect [the books] but they are not there."

In 1997, Ullman completed a synagogue memorial in collaboration with Zvi Hecker and Eyal Weizmann, commemorating the former Lindenstraße synagogue in Kreuzberg.

Another of his creations is "Hochwasser" ("Flooding") on a small island near the Werra River in Germany. It was inspired by a boat Ullman saw there with a sign on it stating it had a capacity of up to seven passengers. Ullman's father, Yitzhak, who had lived nearby, immigrated to Palestine with his seven siblings in 1933.

Ullman is represented in the art collection of the State Academy of Fine Arts Stuttgart with the representative fourpart work ″Du″, created in 1992 and shown at Documenta 9, which was given to the Academy as a permanent loan in 1993 by the Ministry of Science and Art Baden-Württemberg at the suggestion of the former Rector and head of the collection, Wolfgang Kermer.

Sculptural style
Ullman creates subterranean sculptures, some of which barely protrude from the ground. They touch on universal themes such as the meaning of place and home, absence and emptiness. They have been described as simultaneously "celestial and earthbound, metaphysical but sensual and tactile.

Gallery

Education
 1960-1964 Bezalel Academy of Arts and Design Academy, Jerusalem
 1965 Central School of Arts and Crafts, London

Teaching
 1970-1978  Bezalel Academy of Arts and Design, drawing, basic design and etching
 1976 Guest lecturer at Fine Arts Academy, Düsseldorf
 1979 Haifa University, basic design, drawing, three-dimensional design
 1979-1985 Faculty of Architecture, Technion, Haifa
 1991–2005 State Academy of Fine Arts Stuttgart, sculpture

Awards
Ullman was awarded the Israel Prize for sculpture in April 2009.

Awards and Prizes
 1963 Sonborn Prize, Bezalel Academy of Arts and Design Academy of Arts & Design, Jerusalem
 1972 The Beatrice S. Kolliner Award for a Young Israeli Artist, Israel Museum, Jerusalem, Jerusalem, Israel
 1980 The Sandberg Prize for Israeli Art, Israel Museum, Jerusalem, Israel
 1985 Mendel Pundik Prize, Tel Aviv Museum
 1989 Annual Scholarship, DAAD, Berlin
 1995 Käthe Kollwitz Prize, Academy of Arts, Berlin
 1996 Zussman Prize, Yad Vashem
 1996 Member of the Academy of Arts, Berlin
 1997 - פרס החברה לתרבות ולשלום בינלאומי, עמאן, ירדן.
 1998 Janet and George Jarin Prize, America Israel Cultural Foundation 
 2000 Gamzu Prize and Aftovitzer Fund, Tel Aviv Museum of Art, Tel Aviv
 2004 Awarded Honorary Ph.D, The Hebrew University, Jerusalem
 2005 Hans-Thoma-Preis, Staatspreis des Landes Baden - Wurttemberg, Germany
 2009 Israel Prize for Sculpture
 2010 Gerhard- Altenbourg-Preis, Lindenau Museum Altenburg
 2011 Moses-Mendelssohn-Preis des Landes Berlin, Germany

Outdoor and Public Art 
 1983 Sky, limestone, Tel Hai, Israel
 1984 Ben Hinnom Valley, iron and cable, Jerusalem
 1984 Lot's Wife, earth, Mt. Sodom, Israel
 1989 Jesod (Foundation), cement and sand, Rothschild Boulevard, Tel Aviv
 1991 Schodnia (East), asphalt, Lodz, Poland
 1992 Sea Level, cast iron, sandstone and glass, 22 Allenby St., Tel Aviv
 1992 Niemand, corten steel and red loam, Gropius Bau, Berlin, Germany
 1995 Bibliothek, cement and glass, Bebelplatz, Berlin, Germany
 1996-1997 Water, Zion Square, West Jerusalem and Freres Street, East Jerusalem

See also 
 List of Israel Prize recipients
 Dorit Kedar, "A fine balance: Michael Gross and Micha Ulman" In Art In Israel Autumn 1989, Vol. 1, Number 3, Pg. 28-31.

References

External links
 
 
 
 Official site of Staatliche Akademie der Bildenden Künste

1939 births
Living people
Bezalel Academy of Arts and Design alumni
Academic staff of Bezalel Academy of Arts and Design
Israel Prize in sculpture recipients
Israeli Jews
Israeli people of German-Jewish descent
Israeli sculptors
Jewish sculptors
Members of the Academy of Arts, Berlin
People from Tel Aviv
Sandberg Prize recipients